Frenemies is a 2012 teen comedy-drama anthology television film based on the novel of the same name by Alexa Young. It features an ensemble cast starring Bella Thorne, Zendaya, Stefanie Scott, Nick Robinson, Mary Mouser and features Connor Price, Jascha Washington and Dylan Everett. The film follows three pairs of teenage friends that go from friends to enemies and back again. The film was directed by Daisy Mayer and written by Dava Savel, Wendy Weiner, and Jim Krieg. The Disney Channel Original Movie premiered on January 13, 2012, in the United States and Canada.

Plot
The story takes place involving three intertwined stories told by teenage friends who all go to the same school. The first story focuses on how a kid and a dog who are best friends become frenemies and how they become best friends again. The second story focuses   on how two BFFs become total frenemies over a senior editor job. The third and final story focuses on two lookalikes who swap lives with each other, similar to The Princess and the Pauper.

Jake and Murray
The first story focuses on a science whiz teenage boy at Waterbury High School named Jake Logan (Nick Robinson) who is best friends with his dog, Murray (Winston). A popular girl named Julianne (Stefanie Scott) tries to come between them as she tries to get Murray out of her way as Murray sees right through her ruse. Determined to get another "A", she hatches a plan to get Murray out of her way for good. She steals Jake's national prize certificate in molecular astrophysics from NASA, drenches it in her perfume, and drops it through the mail slot in Jake's front door. Just as Julianne expected, Murray mistakes Jake's NASA certificate for one of the love letters Julianne had been giving Jake, takes into the bathroom and attempts to flush it. Jake, who is able to save his certificate, gets angry and yells at Murray to go away. Murray follows his command and runs away from home. A classmate named Savannah O'Neal (Mary Mouser), who loves to skate board and has a crush on Jake, finds Murray and takes him to her house. The next day, Jake starts to worry that Murray might not return, but manages to finish his and Julianne's science project. At school, Jake attempts to dress cool to impress his classmates but Avalon comes and criticizes his outfit and changes it. But when he discovers Julianne's scheme, Jake refuses to give her the project. Savannah uses this opportunity to expose Julianne's ruse of using "people" to get A's, which results in Julianne being caught. Murray runs in and knocks over Julianne and the science project. Although the project is destroyed, Jake is happy to see Murray and they become best friends again.

Avalon and Halley
The second story  focuses on two female teens, Avalon Greene (Bella Thorne) and Halley Brandon (Zendaya) who created a web magazine called "GeeklyChic." In the school library, Halley gets a call from her and Avalon's favorite New York City publishing company, Burns Publications, run by the stunning Cherie St. Claire (Jessalyn Wanlim). Halley thinks her older brother Kendall (Jascha Washington), who is into men's fashion, is playing a prank on her until she sees him doing a service project right out the window of the library and realizes she really has received a call from Cherie. Cherie invites them to go to the publishing company's headquarters in the beautiful Manhattan, New York to ask them something that could change their lives. During the talk, Cherie tells Avalon and Halley that she likes their web magazine and offers to buy it, but decides to only let one of them be the senior editor, because she believes that the quality of the writing will be better. Cherie decides to let each of them write a cover article and will judge who wrote the best article as that writer will become the senior editor. At school, Avalon encounters with classmate Walker (Connor Price), who allows her to contact a French singer named Jean Frank. Now, the two girls decide to interview Jean after his first American sold-out concert which leads them to become frenemies. Meanwhile, Jean reveals himself to the girls that he's American and his real name is Johnny Frankewski. At the end, they decide that they will share the article. Cherie becomes angry and decides not to hire either of them, because of their immaturity with the situation. The television show "Teens Now" picks up their article about Johnny changing his image as he was only posing as a singer from Paris, France. "Teens Now" also broadcasts their blog's website for their audience to check out. Seeing that their web magazine has gone global on their hit counter map, Avalon and Halley make up as best friends again.

Savannah and Emma
The third and final story of the film focuses on Savannah O’Neal and Emma Reynolds-teenage alter egos (both roles are played by Mary Mouser) who trade places because they each believe the other's life is better. Savannah is a teenage tomboy who loves skateboarding and lives with her dad and three brothers. She has a crush on Jake Logan and attends Waterbury High School with Avalon, Halley, Jake, and Julianne. Emma is a teenage rich girly-girl who goes to a private school. Thinking the other has the better life, they trade places (under the persuasion of Halley and Avalon) when they meet at the mall. They soon discover the other didn't have the glamorous life that they thought the other had. Emma (disguised as Savannah) gets a date with Jake and during the date Emma starts acting romantic, causing Savannah to get mad and say "That's (meaning Jake) my boyfriend!" which leads to Emma getting upset when she finds out that Savannah went out with Lance (Dylan Everett) who was Emma's previous boyfriend and the two start fighting and Savannah storms off. Later, at Emma's birthday ball, "Emma" (really Savannah) dumps Lance. The real Emma is overjoyed when she hears about this, because she had been trying to get rid of him ever since they started dating; however, she had never gotten the courage to do so. The girls forgive each other and switch lives once more. Avalon and Halley then lead everyone in a lively dance to "Pose" (by Stefanie Scott) as the film ends.

Cast

 Bella Thorne as Avalon Greene
 Zendaya as Halley Brandon 
 Mary Mouser as Savannah O'Neal / Emma Reynolds
 Nick Robinson as Jake Logan
 Stefanie Scott as Julianne Bryan

 Connor Price as Walker
 Jascha Washington as Kendall Brandon
 Dylan Everett as Lance Lancaster
 Kathryn Greenwood as Lisa Logan
 Doug Murray as Roger O'Neal
 Clive Walton as Walt Reynolds
 Natalie Radford as Jacqueline Reynolds
 Jessalyn Wanlim as Cherie St. Claire
 Jesse Bostick as Emmett
 Julian Kennedy as Owen

Songs
Stefanie Scott and Carlon Jeffery - Pose

Production

The film was shot from April 11 to May 16, 2011, in Richmond Hill, Ontario, Canada. It was filmed at Our Lady Queen of the World Catholic Academy with current grade 11 drama students as extras.

Reception
It premiered on Friday, January 13, 2012, on Disney Channel and garnered 4.207 million viewers. In the United Kingdom and Ireland it had 394,000 viewers.

Accolades

Broadcast

Worldwide the movie aired on Disney Channel. In Canada it premiered on January 13, 2012, and in the United Kingdom and Ireland it premiered on March 2, 2012. It aired in Australia and New Zealand on April 13, 2012, in South Africa on April 28, 2012, and in the Philippines, Singapore, and Malaysia on June 4, 2012.

References

External links

 

2012 television films
2012 films
2012 comedy-drama films
2010s teen comedy-drama films
Alloy Entertainment films
American teen comedy-drama films
Comedy-drama television films
Disney Channel Original Movie films
Films directed by Daisy von Scherler Mayer
Films shot in Toronto
American drama television films
2010s American films